Israel participated in the Eurovision Song Contest 2022 in Turin, Italy with the entry "I.M" performed by Michael Ben David. The Israeli broadcaster Israeli Public Broadcasting Corporation (IPBC/Kan) collaborated with the commercial broadcaster Reshet in order to select the Israeli entry for the 2022 contest. The fourth season of the reality singing competition The X Factor Israel, which was organised by Reshet, was used to select the Israeli entry. The competition concluded with a final on 5 February 2022 that featured four finalists with potential Eurovision songs that were selected for them through a song selection round in January and February 2022. The winner was selected following the combination of the votes from a public vote and two jury groups.

Israel was drawn to compete in the second semi-final of the Eurovision Song Contest which took place on 12 May 2022. Performing during the show in position 2, "I.M" was not announced among the top 10 entries of the second semi-final and therefore did not qualify to compete in the final. It was later revealed that Israel placed 13th out of the 18 participating countries in the semi-final with 61 points.

Background 
Israel has participated in the final for six consecutive years between 2015 and 2021, which included their  entry "Set Me Free" performed by Eden Alene.

The Israeli national broadcaster, Israeli Public Broadcasting Corporation (IPBC/Kan), has been in charge of the nation's participation in the contest since . Kan confirmed Israel's participation in the contest on 21 February 2021. Between 2015 and 2020, the Israeli entry was selected through the reality singing competition  ("The Next Star for Eurovision") in collaboration with Keshet and Tedy Productions, while in 2021, Kan conducted an internal selection to select the artist that would represent Israel and a national final to select the song for the artist. On 6 April 2021, Kan confirmed that they would cooperate with television channel Reshet 13 in order to select the Israeli entry through the reality singing competition The X Factor Israel.

Before Eurovision

The X Factor Israel 

The Israeli entry for the Eurovision Song Contest 2022 was selected through the fourth season of the reality singing competition The X Factor Israel. Show creator Simon Cowell was originally announced as a judge but withdrew prior to the competition. The competition took place over three months, which commenced on 30 October 2021 and concluded on 5 February 2022. All shows in the competition were broadcast on Channel 13 as well as online via 13tv.co.il.

Contestant progress 
Following the audition phase of the competition, 33 contestants advanced after receiving a "yes" from at least four of the five judges. During the Judge Houses and Chairs phase, each member of the judging panel selected from each of their categories four out of eight/nine contestants that advanced from the audition phase. The sixteen remaining contestants then competed during the live shows, which took place over six weeks from 26 December 2021 and resulted in the selection of four finalists following the fifth week. The four finalists were: Eli Huli, Inbal Bibi, Michael Ben David and Sapir Saban.

Song selection round 
On 19 September 2021, Kan opened the public song submission with the deadline on 17 October 2021. Two songs per finalist were chosen from 130 submissions by a six-member professional committee with five members from Kan (four radio representatives and one television representative), among them which included the director of Kan music stations Ofri Gopher, and one from Reshet 13. The eight competing songs were presented on Kan Gimel on 30 January 2022 and the public was able to vote through Kan's official website and mobile application until 3 February 2022. A combination of the votes from the public vote (50%) and two jury groups consisting of The X Factor Israel 2022 judges (25%) and the professional committee (25%) selected one song per finalist to advance to the final, which was revealed during a special televised broadcast titled  ("Our Song for Eurovision") on Kan 11, Kan Gimel as well as online via kan.org.il on 3 February.

Final 
The final took place on 5 February 2022 in the Menora Mivtachim Arena in Tel Aviv. The winner was selected in two rounds. In the duel round, the four finalists were divided into two duels and each performed a cover song. Two entries progressed forward to the final round, while the two others faced each other off in another duel, which picked the third participant of the final round. In the final round, the three finalists that advanced from the duel round presented their candidate Eurovision entries chosen through the song selection round. The winner was selected by a combination of the votes from a public vote (50%) and two jury groups consisting of The X Factor Israel 2022 judges (25%) and the professional committee (25%).

Controversy 
On 12 April 2022, Kan stated that due to a strike in the Israeli Ministry of Foreign Affairs which prevents the deployment of security personnel, the Israeli delegation would not be able to travel to Turin for the time being. The following day, Kan stated: "In the coming days, the GSS will make efforts to help find a solution, even though the Ministry of Foreign Affairs staff committee stands its ground and does not intend to help provide the information necessary to regulate security services. Kan would like to thank the GSS for its assistance and hope that a solution to the crisis will be found soon." On 28 April, it was confirmed that a solution was found, in which the delegation would be split into two, with the first group leaving for Turin on 1 May, and the second on 8 May.

Preparations 
A revamped version of the song was released on 14 March 2022, and was first performed at the Israel Calling pre-party, held in the Menora Mivtachim Arena on 7 April.

At Eurovision 
According to Eurovision rules, all nations with the exceptions of the host country and the "Big Five" (France, Germany, Italy, Spain and the United Kingdom) are required to qualify from one of two semi-finals in order to compete for the final; the top ten countries from each semi-final progress to the final. The European Broadcasting Union (EBU) split up the competing countries into six different pots based on voting patterns from previous contests, with countries with favourable voting histories put into the same pot. On 25 January 2022, an allocation draw was held which placed each country into one of the two semi-finals, as well as which half of the show they would perform. Israel has been placed into the second semi-final, to be held on 12 May 2022, and has been scheduled to perform in the first half of the show.

Once all the competing songs for the 2022 contest had been released, the running order for the semi-finals was decided by the shows' producers rather than through another draw, so that similar songs were not placed next to each other. The country was not announced as one of the ten qualifiers, marking the first time Israel has failed to qualify since 2014. It was later announced that Israel placed thirteenth in the semi-final with 61 points, 27 of which from the televote and 34 from the professional juries.

Voting

Points awarded to Israel

Points awarded by Israel

Detailed voting results
The following members comprised the Israeli jury:
 Dafna Armoni
 Diana Golbi
 Liron Lev
 Shai Lahav
 Yahel Doron

References 

2022
Countries in the Eurovision Song Contest 2022
Eurovision